ntoskrnl.exe (short for Windows NT operating system kernel executable), also known as the kernel image, contains the kernel and executive layers of the Microsoft Windows NT kernel, and is responsible for hardware abstraction, process handling, and memory management. In addition to the kernel and executive mentioned earlier, it contains the cache manager, security reference monitor, memory manager, scheduler (Dispatcher), and blue screen of death (the prose and portions of the code).

Overview 

x86 versions of ntoskrnl.exe depend on bootvid.dll, hal.dll and kdcom.dll (x64 variants of ntoskrnl.exe have these dlls embed into the kernel to increase performance). However, it is not a native application. In other words, it is not linked against ntdll.dll. Instead, ntoskrnl.exe containing a standard "start" entry point that calls the architecture-independent kernel initialization function. Because it requires a static copy of the C Runtime objects, the executable is usually about 10 MB in size.

In Windows XP and earlier, the Windows installation source ships four kernel image files to support uniprocessor systems, symmetric multiprocessor (SMP) systems, CPUs with PAE, and CPUs without PAE. Windows setup decides whether the system is uniprocessor or multiprocessor, then, installs both the PAE and non-PAE variants of the kernel image for the decided kind. On a multiprocessor system, Setup installs ntkrnlmp.exe and ntkrpamp.exe but renames them to ntoskrnl.exe and ntkrnlpa.exe respectively.

Starting with Windows Vista, Microsoft began unifying the kernel images as multi-core CPUs took to the market and PAE became mandatory.

Routines in ntoskrnl use prefixes on their names to indicate in which component of ntoskrnl they are defined.

Since not all functions are being exported by the kernel, function prefixes ending in i or p (such as Mi, Obp, Iop) are internal and not supposed to be accessed by the user. These functions contain the core code and implements important checks, such as for vulnerabilities, missing arguments and exception handling. 

The following table lists some of them.

Initialization 
When the kernel receives control, it gets a struct-type pointer from bootloader. The pointer's destination contains information about the hardware, the path to the Windows Registry file, kernel parameters containing boot preferences or options that change the behavior of the kernel, path of the files loaded by the bootloader (SYSTEM Registry hive, nls for character encoding conversion, and vga font). The definition of this structure can be retrieved by using the kernel debugger or downloading it from the Microsoft symbol database.

In the x86 architecture, the kernel receives the system already in protected mode, with the GDT, IDT and TSS ready. But since it does not know the address of each one, it has to load them one by one to fill the PCR structure.

The main entry point of ntoskrnl.exe performs some system dependent initialization then calls a system independent initialization then enters an idle loop.

Interrupt handling 

Modern operating systems use interrupts instead of I/O port polling to wait for information from devices.

In the x86 architecture, interrupts are handled through the Interrupt Dispatch Table (IDT). When a device triggers an interrupt and the interrupt flag (IF) in the FLAGS register is set, the processor's hardware looks for an interrupt handler in the table entry corresponding to the interrupt number to which in turn has been translated from IRQ by PIC chips, or in more modern hardwares, APIC. Interrupt handlers usually save some subset of the state of registers before handling it and restore them back to their original values when done.

The interrupt table contains handlers for hardware interrupts, software interrupts, and exceptions. For some IA-32 versions of the kernel, one example of such a software interrupt handler (of which there are many) is in its IDT table entry 2E16 (hexadecimal; 46 in decimal), used in assembly language as INT 2EH for system calls. In the real implementation the entry points to an internal subroutine named (as per symbol information published by Microsoft) KiSystemService. For newer versions, different mechanisms making use of SYSENTER instruction and in x86-64 SYSCALL instruction are used instead.

One notable feature of NT's interrupt handling is that interrupts are usually conditionally masked based on their priority (called "IRQL"), instead of disabling all IRQs via the interrupt flag. This permits various kernel components to carry on critical operations without necessarily blocking services of peripherals and other devices.

Memory manager 

The entire physical memory (RAM) address range is broken into many small blocks also called pages, 4KB in size each, and mapped to virtual addresses. A few of the properties of each block are stored in structures called page table entries, which are managed by the OS and accessed by the processor's hardware. Page tables are organized into a tree structure, and the physical page number of the top-level table is stored in control register 3 (CR3).

Microsoft Windows divides virtual address space into two regions. The lower part, starting at zero, is instantiated separately for each process and is accessible from both user and kernel mode. Application programs run in processes and supply code that runs in user mode. 
The upper part is accessible only from kernel mode, and with some exceptions, is instantiated just once, system-wide. Ntoskrnl.exe is mapped into this region, as are several other kernel mode components. This region also contains data used by kernel mode code, such as the kernel mode heaps and the file system cache.

Registry 

Windows Registry is a repository for configuration and settings information for the operating system and for other software, such as applications. It can be thought of as a filesystem optimized for small files. However, it is not accessed through file system-like semantics, but rather through a specialized set of APIs, implemented in kernel mode and exposed to user mode.

The registry is stored on disk as several different files called "hives." One, the System hive, is loaded early in the boot sequence and provides configuration information required at that time. Additional registry hives, providing software-specific and user-specific data, are loaded during later phases of system initialization and during user login, respectively.

Drivers 

The list of drivers to be loaded from the disk are retrieved from the Services key of the current control set's key in the SYSTEM registry hive. That key stores device drivers, kernel processes and user processes. They are all collectively called "services" and are all stored mixed on the same place.

During initialization or upon driver load request, the kernel traverses that tree looking for services tagged as kernel services.

See also 
 Architecture of Windows NT
 Windows NT Startup Process

Notes

References

Further reading

External links
 Inside the Windows Vista Kernel (TechNet Magazine)
 struct LOADER_PARAMETER_BLOCK
 Driver Development Part 1: Introduction to Drivers

Windows NT kernel
Windows files